Sir William Lamond Allardyce,  (14 November 1861 – 10 June 1930) was a career British civil servant in the Colonial Office who served as governor of Fiji (1901–1902), the Falkland Islands (1904–1914), Bahamas (1914–1920), Tasmania (1920–1922), and Newfoundland (1922–1928).

Biography
Allardyce was born near Bombay, India, the son of Georgina Dickson Abbott and Colonel James Allardyce. Educated in Aberdeen, Scotland and at Oxford Military College, at the age of 18, he joined the British Civil Service in the Colonial Office. His brother Kenneth was also a colonial administrator, serving as Secretary for Native Affairs in Fiji.

Allardyce first posting was Fiji, where, just two years after his arrival, he was named acting Resident Commissioner for the island of Rotuma. The following year as magistrate and seven years later he was appointed to the Native Regulation Board and made the commissioner of the Supreme Court. In 1894, he was made Commissioner for Native Lands and given a seat in the Legislative Council. In 1895, he was appointed Native Commissioner, the chief liaison between the Fijian natives and the British. The following year he was appointed Receiver-General. He subsequently became Colonial Secretary and a member of the Executive Council in 1898.

In 1904, Allardyce was appointed as Governor of the Falkland Islands. After ten years at the Falklands, he was then transferred to the Bahamas to become its governor, a position he held for six years. Allardyce then became governor of Tasmania but retired after only two years—taking the last three months as leave—as a result of his failure to obtain an increase in his salary of £2750. In fact, a statement made to the Parliament of Tasmania on his salary and allowances was followed by a vote by the Legislative Assembly to abolish his office, although the same motion was defeated in the Legislative Council. Nevertheless, when he left office he was widely praised for his performance of the office.

Allardyce was subsequently ordered to Newfoundland where he was to succeed Sir Charles Alexander Harris as Governor of Newfoundland, where he was invited to become patron of the Great War Veterans Association. He was the official Crown representative of the unveiling of the National War Memorial by Field Marshal the Earl Haig on 1 July 1924. He officiated at the opening of the other national war memorial, Memorial University College, on 15 September 1925. Allardyce as governor was a key promoter in the decision awarding jurisdiction over most of the Labrador Peninsula to Newfoundland by the Privy Council.

In 1916, Allardyce was made a Knight Commander of the Order of St Michael and St George by King George V. He was advanced to Knight Grand Cross of the Order of St Michael and St George in 1927.

Allardyce was noted as one of the most competent administrators ever appointed by the Colonial Office to serve as the official representative of the British Crown in Newfoundland and Labrador.

Allardyce Range on the island of South Georgia is named for him.

Family 
Allardyce married twice. First, in 1895, to Constance Angel Greene of Melbourne, Australia, daughter of Molesworth Richard Greene. She died in 1918; then, in 1920, he married Elsie Elizabeth Stewart, widow of A.C. Goodfellow. In 1923, Lady Allardyce helped start the Girl Guide movement in Newfoundland, and then in 1924, she established the Newfoundland Outport Nursing and Industrial Association (NONIA).

See also
List of people from Newfoundland and Labrador

References

External links
 Biography at Government House The Governorship of Newfoundland and Labrador

|-

1861 births
1930 deaths
Colonial Secretaries of Fiji
Governors of Fiji
Members of the Executive Council of Fiji
Members of the Legislative Council of Fiji
Governors of the Falkland Islands
Governors of Tasmania
Governors of the Dominion of Newfoundland
Colonial Administrative Service officers
Knights Grand Cross of the Order of St Michael and St George
British governors of the Bahamas
People from Aberdeen
People educated at Oxford Military College
British people in colonial India
High Commissioners for the Western Pacific
20th-century Bahamian people
20th-century British politicians